Michael S. Kadish (born May 27, 1950) is a former American football defensive lineman who played nine seasons in the National Football League (NFL) for the Miami Dolphins and Buffalo Bills.  He played college football at the University of Notre Dame. He was a member of the All-American team in 1971 as a senior. He was the Miami Dolphins' first round draft pick in 1972, and spent the 1972 season on the Dolphins's taxi squad as the team won Super Bowl VII while going undefeated.  He was traded to the Bills prior to the 1973 season in exchange for offensive lineman Irv Goode.

References 

1950 births
Living people
American football defensive tackles
Notre Dame Fighting Irish football players
Players of American football from Grand Rapids, Michigan
Buffalo Bills players
Miami Dolphins players